
Laguna Jara is a lake in the Beni Department, Bolivia. At an elevation of 191 m, its surface area is 16.5 km2.

Lakes of Beni Department